Kartal is an underground station on the M4 line of the Istanbul Metro in Kartal. It is located beneath the Kartal interchange, along the D.100 State Highway in the Cumhuriyet neighborhood. Kartal was the eastern terminus of the M4 from its opening in 2012 to 2016, when the line was extended further to Pendik. Connection to IETT city buses and Istanbul Minibus service is available. The station consists of an island platform with two tracks and was opened on 17 August 2012.

Station Layout

References

Railway stations opened in 2012
Istanbul metro stations
Kartal
2012 establishments in Turkey